Spandau:  The Secret Diaries is a 1975 book by Albert Speer.  While it principally deals with Speer's time while incarcerated at Spandau Prison, it also contains much material on his role in the Third Reich and his relationship with Adolf Hitler. The book became a bestseller.

See also
Inside the Third Reich

Bibliography

 
()

1975 non-fiction books
Books by Albert Speer
Political autobiographies